Giant click beetle can refer to several large members of the family Elateridae, including:

Oxynopterus
Oxynopterus mucronatus
Tetralobus
Tetralobus flabellicornis